I'm Not Making Music for Money is the twelfth and final studio album by The First Edition. The album was released in 1974 and only issued in New Zealand.

Track listing

Personnel
 Kenny Rogers – vocals, bass
 Mary Arnold – vocals, tambourine
 Jimmy Hassell – guitar, vocals
 Terry Williams – guitar, vocals
 Mickey Jones – drums, percussion
 Gene Lorenzo – Keyboards

References

External links

 I'm Not Making Music for Money att Rate Your Music

1974 albums
Kenny Rogers and The First Edition albums